or  is a  lake in Norway. The lake lies in the municipalities of Namsskogan (in Trøndelag county) and Grane (in Nordland county).

See also
 List of lakes in Norway
 Geography of Norway

References

Lakes of Trøndelag
Lakes of Nordland
Namsskogan
Grane, Nordland